The BlackBerry Curve 8520 is a smartphone from the BlackBerry Curve series manufactured in Canada. It is also known as the BlackBerry Gemini.

Description
The BlackBerry Curve 8520 is a consumer  smartphone and has standard features including mobile email, calendar and instant messaging among many others.

The Curve 8520 has a new touch-sensitive optical trackpad as opposed to the trackball used on many other BlackBerry devices - this is said to improve the ease of scrolling through menus, emails, Web pages and images.

The Curve 8520 was discontinued in April 2012, when the BlackBerry Curve 9220 was introduced as its successor.

References 

Mobile phones with an integrated hardware keyboard
Curve 8520